The Wilkinson-Keele House is a historic house in Manchester, Tennessee. It was built in 1888 by J. G. Wilkinson, the president of the Bank of Manchester, and designed in the Queen Anne architectural style. It was purchased by Judge Robert Keele  in 1937. It has been listed on the National Register of Historic Places since November 15, 2006.

References

National Register of Historic Places in Coffee County, Tennessee
Queen Anne architecture in Tennessee
Houses completed in 1888
1888 establishments in Tennessee
Manchester, Tennessee